The 1850 United States House of Representatives election in Florida was held on Monday, October 7, 1846 to elect the single United States Representative from the state of Florida, one from the state's single at-large congressional district, to represent Florida in the 32nd Congress. The election coincided with the elections of other offices, including the senatorial election and various state and local elections.

The winning candidate would serve a two-year term in the United States House of Representatives from March 4, 1851, to March 4, 1853.

Candidates

Whig

Nominee 

 Edward Carrington Cabell, incumbent U.S. representative

Democratic

Nominee 

 John Beard, former North Carolina state senator

Campaign 
Despite the weakness of the Whig Party after the death of President Zachary Taylor, Beard was a source of great controversy. Beard, a staunch advocate of nullification while he was in North Carolina, became one of Florida's earliest secessionists. Beard claimed that with the admission of Texas to the United States, the South had enough power to break free through war.

Cabell ran on the complete opposite as Beard, arguing that the Compromise of 1850 will bring peace and an end to the slavery question. Many Floridians were also skeptical of breaking free from a Union they had just joined.

General election

Results

Results by County

See also
United States House of Representatives elections, 1850

References

1850
Florida
United States House of Representatives